Lithuania competed at the 2016 Summer Olympics in Rio de Janeiro, Brazil, from 5 to 21 August 2016. This was the nation's seventh consecutive appearance at the Games in the post-Soviet era and ninth overall in Summer Olympic history.

The National Olympic Committee of Lithuania fielded a team of 67 athletes, 48 men and 19 women, across 15 sports at the Games. It was the nation's second-largest delegation sent to the Olympics, just four athletes short of the record achieved in Beijing 2008 (71). As usual, the men's basketball was the only team-based sport in which Lithuania qualified for the Games. Lithuania marked its Olympic debut in tennis and women's judo, as well as its return to weightlifting after missing out of the previous Games.

The Lithuanian squad featured three Olympic medalists from London 2012, namely light welterweight boxer Evaldas Petrauskas, breaststroke swimmer and world record holder Rūta Meilutytė, and defending champion Laura Asadauskaitė in the women's modern pentathlon. Track cyclist Simona Krupeckaitė topped the list of experienced Lithuanian athletes to make her fourth Olympic appearance, while Laser Radial sailor and Beijing 2008 silver medalist Gintarė Scheidt was selected to lead the Lithuanian delegation as the flag bearer in the opening ceremony at her third Games, a historic first by a female in the nation's Olympic history. Other notable Lithuanian athletes included NBA players Jonas Valančiūnas and Domantas Sabonis (son of basketball legend and three-time Olympian Arvydas Sabonis), multiple-time European rowing medalist Mindaugas Griškonis, and swimming stalwarts Simonas Bilis and Giedrius Titenis.

Lithuania left Rio de Janeiro with four medals (one silver and three bronze), failing to collect a gold for the third time in its Olympic history. Three of these medals were awarded to the Lithuanian team in weightlifting and rowing for the first time in 16 years, including a silver-medal feat from Griskonis and his new partner Saulius Ritter in the men's double sculls. Meanwhile, Aurimas Lankas and Edvinas Ramanauskas continued to add canoeing medals for Lithuania with a bronze in the men's K-2 200 m, following Jevgenijus Šuklinas' runner-up finish at London 2012. Once again, the men's basketball squad failed to reach the medal rounds for the second straight time, losing to Australia in the quarterfinals.

Medalists

|  style="text-align:left; width:78%; vertical-align:top;"|

|  style="text-align:left; width:22%; vertical-align:top;"|

Competitors

Athletics

Lithuanian athletes have so far achieved qualifying standards in the following athletics events (up to a maximum of 3 athletes in each event):

Track & road events
Men

Women

Field events

Basketball

Men's tournament

The Lithuanian men's basketball team qualified for the Olympics by attaining a top two finish after the final match of the EuroBasket 2015 in France.

Team roster

Group play

Quarterfinal

Boxing

Lithuania has entered two boxers to compete in each of the following weight classes into the Olympic boxing tournament. London 2012 bronze medalist Evaldas Petrauskas and European champion Eimantas Stanionis had claimed their Olympic spots at the 2016 European Qualification Tournament in Samsun, Turkey.

Canoeing

Sprint
Lithuanian canoeists have qualified a total of four boats in each of the following distances for the Games through the 2015 ICF Canoe Sprint World Championships. The sprint canoeing roster was named to the Olympic squad at the conclusion of the 2016 European Sprint Qualifier in Duisburg, Germany.

Qualification Legend: FA = Qualify to final (medal); FB = Qualify to final B (non-medal)

Cycling

Road
Lithuanian riders qualified for a maximum of two quota places in the men's Olympic road race by virtue of their top 15 final national ranking in the 2015 UCI Europe Tour. One additional spot was awarded to the Lithuanian cyclist in the women's road race by virtue of her top 100 individual placement in the 2016 UCI World Rankings.

Track
Following the completion of the 2016 UCI Track Cycling World Championships, Lithuania has entered one rider to compete only in both women's sprint and keirin at the Olympics, by virtue of her final individual UCI Olympic rankings in those events.

Sprint

Keirin

Gymnastics

Artistic
Lithuania has entered one artistic gymnast into the Olympic competition. Robert Tvorogal had claimed his Olympic spot in the men's apparatus and all-around events at the Olympic Test Event in Rio de Janeiro.

Men

Judo

Lithuania has qualified one judoka for the women's heavyweight category (+78 kg) at the Games. Santa Pakenytė earned a continental quota spot from the European region as the highest-ranked Lithuanian judoka in the IJF World Ranking List of 30 May 2016.

Modern pentathlon

Lithuania has qualified three modern pentathletes for the following events at the Games. Reigning London 2012 champion Laura Asadauskaitė sought an opportunity to defend her Olympic title in the women's event, after being crowned the 2015 UIPM World Cup champion in Minsk, Belarus. Meanwhile, Justinas Kinderis and Ieva Serapinaitė were ranked among the top 10 modern pentathletes, not yet qualified, in their respective events based on the UIPM World Rankings as of 1 June 2016.

Rowing

Lithuania has qualified a total of five boats for each of the following classes into the Olympic regatta. Rowers competing in the single and double sculls (both men and women), as well as the men's quadruple sculls, had confirmed Olympic places for their boats at the 2015 FISA World Championships in Lac d'Aiguebelette, France.

Men

Women

Qualification Legend: FA=Final A (medal); FB=Final B (non-medal); FC=Final C (non-medal); FD=Final D (non-medal); FE=Final E (non-medal); FF=Final F (non-medal); SA/B=Semifinals A/B; SC/D=Semifinals C/D; SE/F=Semifinals E/F; QF=Quarterfinals; R=Repechage

Sailing

Lithuanian sailors have qualified one boat in each of the following classes through the 2014 ISAF Sailing World Championships, the individual fleet Worlds, and European qualifying regattas.

M = Medal race; DNF = Did not finish; UFD = "U" flag disqualification; EL = Eliminated – did not advance into the medal race;

Shooting

Lithuania has received an invitation from ISSF to send Ronaldas Račinskas in the men's skeet to the Olympics, as long as the minimum qualifying score (MQS) was fulfilled by 31 March 2016.

Qualification Legend: Q = Qualify for the next round; q = Qualify for the bronze medal (shotgun)

Swimming

Lithuanian swimmers have so far achieved qualifying standards in the following events (up to a maximum of 2 swimmers in each event at the Olympic Qualifying Time (OQT), and potentially 1 at the Olympic Selection Time (OST)):

Men

Women

Tennis

Lithuania has entered one tennis player for the first time into the Olympic tournament. Ričardas Berankis (world no. 54) qualified directly for the men's singles as one of the top 56 eligible players in the ATP World Rankings as of 6 June 2016.

Weightlifting

Lithuania has qualified one male weightlifter for the Olympics by virtue of his top 15 individual finish, among those who had not secured any quota places through the World or European Championships, in the IWF World Rankings as of 20 June 2016, signifying the nation's return to the sport after an eight-year hiatus. The place was awarded to rookie Aurimas Didžbalis in the men's middle-heavyweight division (94 kg).

Wrestling

Lithuania has qualified one wrestler for the men's Greco-Roman 66 kg into the Olympic competition as a result of his wrestle-off triumph at the initial meet of the World Qualification Tournament in Ulaanbaatar.

Men's Greco-Roman

See also
Lithuania at the 2016 Summer Paralympics

References

External links 

 

Olympics
2016
Nations at the 2016 Summer Olympics